Fishkin is a surname. Notable people with the surname include:

Arnold Fishkind (1919–1999), American jazz bassist, sometimes credited as Arnold Fishkin
Daniel Fishkin, American musician
James S. Fishkin (born 1948), American academic
Shelley Fisher Fishkin (born 1950), American academic

See also
Judy Fiskin (born 1945), American artist